Dancing in the Dark may refer to:

Film and television
Dancing in the Dark (1949 film), an American musical comedy directed by Irving Reis
Dancing in the Dark (1986 film), a Canadian drama directed by Leon Marr
"Dancing in the Dark" (Charlie's Angels), a television episode
"Dancing in the Dark" (The Golden Girls), a television episode
Dancing in the Dark, a 1995 television film starring Victoria Principal

Literature
Dancing in the Dark (novel), a 2005 novel by Caryl Phillips
Dancing in the Dark, a 1982 novel by Joan Barfoot
Dancing in the Dark, a 2005 novel by Mary Jane Clark
Dancing in the Dark, a 1997 novel by Stuart M. Kaminsky
Dancing in the Dark, a 1999 novel by Maureen Lee
Dancing in the Dark, a novel by Susan Moody
Dancing in the Dark, a 1992 novel by Donald Thomas

Music

Albums
Dancing in the Dark (Sonny Rollins album), 1987
Dancing in the Dark (Rob Schneiderman album), 1998
Dancing in the Dark: 10 Years of Dancing Ferret, 2005
Dancing in the Dark, by the Fred Hersch Trio, 1992
Dancing in the Dark, by Tierney Sutton, 2004

Songs
"Dancing in the Dark" (Bruce Springsteen song), 1984
"Dancing in the Dark" (Howard Dietz and Arthur Schwartz song), 1931
"Dancing in the Dark" (Jessy song), 2006
"Dancing in the Dark" (Kim Wilde song), 1983
"Dancing in the Dark" (Rihanna song), 2015
"Dancing in the Dark", by Imagine Dragons  from Evolve, 2017
"Dancing in the Dark", by Mike Mareen, 1985
"Dancing in the Dark", by Solange Knowles from Sol-Angel and the Hadley St. Dreams, 2008
"Dancing in the Dark", by Sykamore from Pinto, 2022

See also
"Dance in the Dark", a 2009 song by Lady Gaga
Dance in the Dark (horse), a Japanese Thoroughbred racehorse
Dancer in the Dark (disambiguation)